The Bouncers are one of six teams currently competing in SlamBall

History
The Bouncers, Diablos, Slashers, and Steal joined the Rumble and Mob in their first ever season of Slamball in 2002. The Bouncers made the playoffs but were defeated in the 1st round by the Diablos. The next season they finished 3rd in Division Y and failed to make the playoffs. When Slamball returned, after a hiatus until 2008, the Bouncers changed their colors and ended up finishing with the worst record in Slamball history, 2–10 after starting 2–0.

Season-by-season

Personnel

Head coaches

Current roster

Slamball
Sports clubs established in 2002